Pierre Malet (born 3 September 1955 at Saint-Tropez, Var) is a French actor.  He is the twin brother of Laurent Malet.

Filmography 
 1976 : Le Siècle des lumières (TV) : A page
 1976 : Comme un boomerang : Other Feldman's son
 1976 : Un éléphant ça trompe énormément
 1977 : Au plaisir de Dieu (feuilleton TV) : Jacques jeune
 1978 : Un ours pas comme les autres (feuilleton TV)
 1978 : Kakemono hôtel (TV) : Jean Cagepain
 1979 : Staline-Trotsky: Le pouvoir et la révolution (TV) : Liova
 1980 :  (TV miniseries) : Jérôme Fandor
 1980 : Le Vol d'Icare (TV) : Icare
 1981 : Les Fiançailles de feu (TV) : Joss
 1981 :  (TV film, directed by Étienne Périer) : Roland
 1981 : Arcole ou la terre promise (feuilleton TV) : Frédéric Dumourier
 1982 : La Nuit de Varennes : Emile Delage, student revolutionary
 1982 : L'Amour s'invente (TV) : Pierre Morency
 1983 : Capitaine X (feuilleton TV) : François Leroy-Boucher
 1984 : Mistral's Daughter (TV miniseries) : Eric Avigdor
 1984 : Il Quartetto Basileus : Edo
 1985 : La Part de l'autre (TV)
 1985 : L'Ordre (TV)
 1986 : Francesca è mia
 1987 : Ubac : Raoul de Marsac
 1989 : Burro
 1989 : Mortelle saison (TV) : Marc Palladio
 1990 :  (TV) : François
 1993 : Total!
 1993 : La Fièvre monte à El Pao (TV) : Vasquez
 1995 : Un homme de cœur (TV)
 2010 : Streamfield, les carnets noirs : Iskander Labade

External links 
 

1955 births
Living people
People from Saint-Tropez
French male film actors
French male television actors